Globoko pri Šmarju is a settlement in the Municipality of Šmarje pri Jelšah in eastern Slovenia. It lies in the hills southwest of Šmarje. The municipality is included in the Savinja Statistical Region and is part of the traditional region of Styria.

Name
The name of the settlement was changed from Globoko to Globoko pri Šmarju in 1953.

References

External links
Globoko pri Šmarju at Geopedia

Populated places in the Municipality of Šmarje pri Jelšah